Tomás Ezequiel Galván (born 11 April 2000) is an Argentine professional footballer who plays for Defensa y Justicia on loan from River Plate as a midfielder.

Career

Club
Galván is youth product of River Plate, having joined their academy at the age of 6. In 2021, he signed a contract keeping him at the club until 31 December 2022. He debuted for River Plate in a Argentine Primera División match against their rivals Boca Juniors in the Superclásico. The game was 1–1 before heading to overtime, and finished 4–2 in penalties.

In January 2022, Galván joined Defensa y Justicia on a one-year dry loan.

References

External links
 

Living people
2000 births
People from Tigre, Buenos Aires
Argentine footballers
Association football midfielders
Club Atlético River Plate footballers
Defensa y Justicia footballers
Argentine Primera División players
Sportspeople from Buenos Aires Province